A lagoon is a shallow body of water separated from a larger body of water by a narrow landform, such as reefs, barrier islands, barrier peninsulas, or isthmuses. Lagoons are commonly divided into coastal lagoons (or barrier lagoons) and atoll lagoons. They have also been identified as occurring on mixed-sand and gravel coastlines. There is an overlap between bodies of water classified as coastal lagoons and bodies of water classified as estuaries. Lagoons are common coastal features around many parts of the world.

Definition and terminology
Lagoons are shallow, often elongated bodies of water separated from a larger body of water by a shallow or exposed shoal, coral reef, or similar feature. Some authorities include fresh water bodies in the definition of "lagoon", while others explicitly restrict "lagoon" to bodies of water with some degree of salinity. The distinction between "lagoon" and "estuary" also varies between authorities. Richard A. Davis Jr. restricts "lagoon" to bodies of water with little or no fresh water inflow, and little or no tidal flow, and calls any bay that receives a regular flow of fresh water an "estuary". Davis does state that the terms "lagoon" and "estuary" are "often loosely applied, even in scientific literature". Timothy M. Kusky characterizes lagoons as normally being elongated parallel to the coast, while estuaries are usually drowned river valleys, elongated perpendicular to the coast. Coastal lagoons are classified as inland bodies of water.

When used within the context of a distinctive portion of coral reef ecosystems, the term "lagoon" is synonymous with the term "back reef" or "backreef", which is more commonly used by coral reef scientists to refer to the same area.

Many lagoons do not include "lagoon" in their common names. Currituck, Albemarle and Pamlico Sounds in North Carolina, Great South Bay between Long Island and the barrier beaches of Fire Island in New York, Isle of Wight Bay, which separates Ocean City, Maryland from the rest of Worcester County, Maryland, Banana River in Florida, US, Lake Illawarra in New South Wales, Australia, Montrose Basin in Scotland, and Broad Water in Wales have all been classified as lagoons, despite their names. In England, The Fleet at Chesil Beach has also been described as a lagoon.

Contrariwise, several other languages have specific words for such bodies of water. In New Zealand the Māori word  refers to a coastal lagoon formed at the mouth of a braided river where there are mixed sand and gravel beaches, while , an ephemeral coastal waterbody, is neither a true lagoon, lake nor estuary.

Some languages differentiate between coastal and atoll lagoons.
In Vietnamese,  refers to an atoll lagoon, whilst  is coastal.

In Latin America, the term  in Spanish, which lagoon translates to, may be used for a small fresh water lake in a similar way a creek is considered a small river. However, sometimes it is popularly used to describe a full-sized lake, such as Laguna Catemaco in Mexico, which is actually the third-largest lake by area in the country. The brackish water lagoon may be thus explicitly identified as a "coastal lagoon". In Portuguese, a similar usage is found:  may be a body of shallow seawater, or a small freshwater lake not linked to the sea.

Etymology
Lagoon is derived from the Italian , which refers to the waters around Venice, the Venetian Lagoon. Laguna is attested in English by at least 1612, and had been Anglicized to "lagune" by 1673. In 1697 William Dampier referred to a "Lagune or Lake of Salt water" on the coast of Mexico. Captain James Cook described an island "of Oval form with a Lagoon in the middle" in 1769.

Atoll lagoons

Atoll lagoons form as coral reefs grow upwards while the islands that the reefs surround subside, until eventually only the reefs remain above sea level. Unlike the lagoons that form shoreward of fringing reefs, atoll lagoons often contain some deep (>) portions.

Coastal lagoons

Coastal lagoons form along gently sloping coasts where barrier islands or reefs can develop offshore, and the sea-level is rising relative to the land along the shore (either because of an intrinsic rise in sea-level, or subsidence of the land along the coast). Due to the gentle slope of the coast, coastal lagoons are shallow. A relative drop in sea level may leave a lagoon largely dry, while a rise in sea level may let the sea breach or destroy barrier islands, and leave reefs too deep underwater to protect the lagoon. Coastal lagoons are young and dynamic, and may be short-lived in geological terms. Coastal lagoons are common, occurring along nearly 15 percent of the world's shorelines. In the United States, lagoons are found along more than 75 percent of the Eastern and Gulf Coasts.

Coastal lagoons are usually connected to the open ocean by inlets between barrier islands. The number and size of the inlets, precipitation, evaporation, and inflow of fresh water all affect the nature of the lagoon. Lagoons with little or no interchange with the open ocean, little or no inflow of fresh water, and high evaporation rates, such as Lake St. Lucia, in South Africa, may become highly saline. Lagoons with no connection to the open ocean and significant inflow of fresh water, such as the Lake Worth Lagoon in Florida in the middle of the 19th century, may be entirely fresh. On the other hand, lagoons with many wide inlets, such as the Wadden Sea, have strong tidal currents and mixing. Coastal lagoons tend to accumulate sediments from inflowing rivers, from runoff from the shores of the lagoon, and from sediment carried into the lagoon through inlets by the tide. Large quantities of sediment may be occasionally be deposited in a lagoon when storm waves overwash barrier islands. Mangroves and marsh plants can facilitate the accumulation of sediment in a lagoon. Benthic organisms may stabilize or destabilize sediments.

Largest coastal lagoons 
New Caledonian lagoon: 
: 
Mayotte lagoon: ~
Rangiroa lagoon: 
Marovo Lagoon:

Regulation
In the European Union, coastal lagoon habitat is classified and under Directive 92/43/EEC on the conservation of natural habitats and wild flora and fauna (Habitats Directive). Furthermore, numerous bird species breed in coastal lagoons. As a result, many lagoons are also protected under Directive 2009/147/EC on the conservation of birds (Birds Directive).

Images

See also

 Aerated lagoon
 Anaerobic lagoon
 Ayre (landform)
 Braided river
 Coast
 Estuary
 Longshore drift
 Sediment transport

External links 
 Coastal lagoon.

References

 
Coastal and oceanic landforms
Oceanographical terminology
Bodies of water